Shogo, Shōgo, Shohgo or Shougo (written: , , , , , , , , , , , , , , , ,  or ) is a masculine Japanese given name. Notable people with the name include:

, Japanese baseball player
, Japanese professional baseball player
, Japanese politician
, Japanese basketball player and coach
, Japanese sumo wrestler
, Japanese footballer
, Japanese basketball player and coach
, Japanese singer-songwriter
, Japanese footballer
, Japanese footballer
, Japanese baseball player and cricketer
, Japanese footballer
, Japanese anime director
, Japanese rugby union player and coach
, Japanese footballer
, Japanese baseball player
, Japanese footballer
, Japanese rugby union player
, Japanese fencer
, Japanese footballer
, Japanese artistic gymnast
, Japanese footballer
, Japanese actor
, Japanese footballer
, Japanese actor
, Japanese footballer
, Japanese footballer
, Japanese actor and narrator
, Japanese actor
, Japanese swimmer
, Japanese footballer
, Japanese film producer and screenwriter
, Japanese actor
, Japanese baseball player
, Japanese footballer
, Japanese footballer

Fictional characters:
Shogo Kawada, a character in the novel, manga, and film Battle Royale
Shogo Makishima, a character in the anime series Psycho-Pass 
Shogo Taguchi, a minor antagonist in the anime series That Time I Got Reincarnated as a Slime
Shogo Akuji, a minor antagonist in Saints Row 2

Shōgō, Shougou or Shohgoh (written: ,  or ) is a separate given name, though it may be romanized the same way. Notable people with the name include:

, Japanese karateka
, Japanese comedian

See also
Shogo (musician)
Shogo: Mobile Armor Division

Japanese masculine given names